Charles Young (January 12, 1893 – May 12, 1952) nicknamed "CY", was a professional baseball pitcher. He played for one season in Major League Baseball, appearing in 9 games for the Baltimore Terrapins of the Federal League during the 1915 season.

References

External links

Major League Baseball pitchers
Baltimore Terrapins players
Quincy Gems players
Hannibal Mules players
Richmond Virginians (minor league) players
Little Rock Travelers players
Baseball players from Pennsylvania
1893 births
1952 deaths